Ed Dowie is an English vocalist and songwriter from Wimborne in Dorset born 1977.

Dowie was an organist and choirboy as a child.  He was previously a member of the Bournemouth-based band Brothers in Sound, who released an album on Regal Recordings in 2000. He studied experimental music for several years before launching a solo career. Signing with Lost Map Records, he released his debut full-length, The Uncle Sold, in 2017. The album's name is an allusion to Kazuo Ishiguro's 1995 novel, The Unconsoled.

Discography
Unpacking My Library EP (2013)
The Adjustable Arm EP (2014)
PostMap 01°09 Yungpawel Postcard single (2016)
The Uncle Sold (2017)
The Obvious I (2021)

References

Year of birth missing (living people)
Living people
English male singers
English electronic musicians
Musicians from Dorset